Telkibánya is a village in Borsod-Abaúj-Zemplén county, in the Northern Hungary region of northeastern Hungary.

Geography

Main Sights
Protestant cemetery and church
St. Catherine zion
Mining Museum
Ruins of Koncfalva
Ice cave
Mining pits and former gold washing claims
Surface minerals
Surface perlite flow

Gallery

References

External links 

Populated places in Borsod-Abaúj-Zemplén County